Eberhard Godt (15 August 1900 – 13 September 1995) was a German naval officer who served in both World War I and World War II, eventually rising to command the Kriegsmarines U-boat operations.

Biography
 This article incorporates information from the equivalent articles on the German Wikipedia

After the war he served in the Marinebrigade Ehrhardt. In March 1920 he was accepted in the Reichsmarine, becoming an officer in 1924. He served aboard numerous surface ships and naval installations until 1935; when he was serving on the light cruiser Emden as adjutant to Kapitän zur See Karl Dönitz. Then Korvettenkapitän (Lieutenant Commander) Godt transferred to the newly established U-boat arm; commanding  during the Spanish Civil War.

In January 1938 he was appointed to the staff of the commander of the U-boat force, Admiral Dönitz. In October he became the force's chief of operations. He continued in this role until January 1943 when he assumed full tactical command of U-Boat operations after Dönitz was promoted to command the Kriegsmarine. In March Godt was promoted to Konteradmiral (Rear Admiral) and assigned, additionally to his U-boat duties, to a department command at the Naval High Command. In 1945 he became a POW and remained in British custody until 1947. During this time he also testified as a witness in the Nuremberg trials.

Following the war he wrote a history of Kriegsmarine operations in World War II as member of the Naval Historical Team.

Godt died at the age of 95 on 13 September 1995.

Dates of rank
 Seekadett (Junior Cadet): 1 July 1918
 Fähnrich zur See (Senior Cadet): 1 April 1922
 Oberfähnrich zur See (Midshipman): 1 October 1923
 Leutnant zur See (Acting Sub-Lieutenant): 1 April 1924
 Oberleutnant zur See (Sub-Lieutenant): 1 January 1926
 Kapitänleutnant (Lieutenant): 1 July 1933
 Korvettenkapitän (Corvette Captain / Lieutenant Commander): 1 April 1937
 Fregattenkapitän (Frigate Captain / Commander): 1 July 1940
 Kapitän zur See (Line Captain): 1 September 1942
 Konteradmiral'' (Rear Admiral, Lower Half): 1 March 1943

Decorations and awards
 Iron Cross (1914)
 2nd class (1918)
 Hanseatic Cross of Lübeck (1918)
 Clasp to the Iron Cross (1939)
 2nd class
 Iron Cross (1939)
 1st class
 German Cross in Gold (10 February 1942)

References

Bibliography

1900 births
1995 deaths
Counter admirals of the Kriegsmarine
U-boat commanders (Kriegsmarine)
Recipients of the Gold German Cross
Recipients of the Hanseatic Cross (Lübeck)
Kriegsmarine personnel of World War II
Imperial German Navy personnel of World War I
Reichsmarine personnel
Military personnel from Lübeck
Naval Historical Team members
20th-century Freikorps personnel